Championship Manager 2008 is an iteration in Eidos' Championship Manager series of computer games.

It is available for Windows and Mac although there is no PSP version as there was in Championship Manager 2007. The game was released on November 2, 2007.

Features
Users can now play in a multi-player mode, meaning that they can have more than one person on an account. Also, users can manage nations and can apply "Club Benefactor", which lets the user have more money, although these additions were added in the previous Championship Manager. Another feature is the addition of more leagues – for example, the Australian League – player tendencies and team talks.

The game uses ProZone tool to give a comprehensive database of player statistics.

Reaction

Championship Manager 2008 received average reviews but was criticised by GameSpot UK who said it "ultimately fails because it doesn't seem to know who it's aiming at".

GameSpot gave Championship Manager 2008 a score of "6". PC Gamer UK gave the game 72 out of 100 but Ferrango gave it 45 out of 100, showing the reception of the game was mixed.

Other Versions
 A mobile version of this game, Championship Manager 2008 Mobile  was developed in 2008, by BAFTA award-winning  mobile games developer Dynamo Games.

See also
Football Manager 2008

References

2007 video games
Eidos Interactive games
MacOS games
Windows games
Association football management video games
Video games developed in the United Kingdom